"When She Says Baby" is a song written by Rhett Akins and Ben Hayslip and recorded by American country music artist Jason Aldean. It was released in November 2013 as the fifth and final single from Aldean's 2012 album Night Train.

Critical reception
The song received a favorable review from Taste of Country, which said that "it speaks to the masses with lyrics that are easy to relate to."

Music video
The music video was taken from Aldean's Night Train to Georgia DVD, filmed at the University of Georgia's Sanford Stadium. It premiered on the CMT Hot 20 Countdown on November 16, 2013.

History

Commercial performance
"When She Says Baby" debuted at No. 58 on the U.S. Billboard Country Airplay chart for the week of November 9, 2013. It also debuted at No. 33 on the U.S. Billboard Hot Country Songs chart for the week of November 3, 2012 as an album track. It also debuted at No. 93 on the U.S. Billboard Hot 100 chart for the week of December 14, 2013. The song has sold 711,000 copies in the U.S. as of April 2014.

The song debuted at No. 76 on the Canadian Hot 100 chart for the week of December 21, 2013.

Las Vegas shooting
On October 1, 2017, a gunman, identified as 64-year-old Stephen Paddock of Mesquite, Nevada opened fire on the audience at a country music festival being held on the Las Vegas Strip in Paradise, Nevada, headlined by Aldean, Eric Church and Sam Hunt. The shooting began when Aldean, who was serving as the festival's closing act, started performing the song.

Charts and certifications

Weekly charts

Year-end charts

Certifications

References

2013 singles
Jason Aldean songs
Songs written by Rhett Akins
Songs written by Ben Hayslip
Song recordings produced by Michael Knox (record producer)
BBR Music Group singles
2012 songs